was a Japanese film director best known in the West for his early films in the Super Giant series, and for his films in the ero guro ("erotic-grotesque") subgenre of pinku eiga such as Shogun's Joy of Torture (1968). He also directed the 1965 film Abashiri Prison, which helped to make Ken Takakura a major star in Japan. Referred to in Japan as "The King of Cult", Ishii had a much more prolific and eclectic career than was generally known in the West during his lifetime.

Early life
Born in Tokyo's Asakusa neighborhood in 1924, Ishii developed a love of cinema early. His parents would often take him to see foreign films, particularly French movies. Ishii worked at Toho Studios as an assistant director beginning in 1942. His film career was interrupted when he was sent to Manchuria during World War II to take aerial photographs for bombing runs.

Shintoho
In March, 1947 Ishii joined the newly founded Shintoho studios. Ishii would later recall his time with Shintoho as, "without doubt the most joyful period of my professional life." While at Shintoho he worked as assistant director to Mikio Naruse, whom he considered his mentor for the rest of his career. He also worked for director Hiroshi Shimizu and studied script writing with Shinichi Sekizawa, best known in the West for his entries in the Godzilla series. Ishii's directorial debut was in 1957 with the boxing film King of the Ring: The World of Glory (Ring no Oja: Eiko no Sekai).

He was next assigned to direct six installments in the children's science-fiction series, Super Giant. This nine-episode series was later re-packaged into four films for U.S. syndicated television as Starman. From 1958 to 1961 Ishii directed four films in the film-noir Line (Chitai) series. For the last of these films, Sexy Line (Sexy Chitai) (1961), Ishii took his cameras to the streets of Asakusa and Ginza, in order to film real life on location. The film has been called "sharp, witty and contagious" and "a lively portrait of the Tokyo underworld, populated by hookers, johns, crooks and cops and shot in cinéma-verité style."

Toei
Shintoho declared bankruptcy in 1961, forcing Ishii to seek employment at another studio. He moved to Toei Company where he directed Flower and Storm and Gang (Hana to Arashi to Gang) (1961), starring Ken Takakura. His 1965 Abashiri Bangaichi with Takakura would solidify that actor's stardom and give Ishii his biggest success of the 1960s. Ishii would go on to direct 10 of the 18 films in this series.

In 1968, Ishii initiated two popular, long-running series for Toei. In the first entry in the Hot Springs Geisha series (1968–1972), Ishii successfully replaced his usual "darkly sardonic cinematic style in favor of this light and frivolous 'mainstream' comedy about geisha masseuses operating inside a hotsprings resort." Ishii left this series to other directors. The Joys of Torture series (1968–1973), however, suited Ishii's taste. Beginning with Shogun's Joy of Torture (1968), Ishii directed all eight entries in the series, which examined the history of torture in Japan. A fan of the work of horror and suspense author Edogawa Rampo since childhood, Ishii adapted many of his horror stories into his films of this period, including Horrors of Malformed Men. The term ero-guro ("erotic-grotesque"), used to describe Rampo's writings, was also applied to Ishii's style in these films, and the term is still used to describe the most extreme of the S&M films in Japan. Of these, the Weissers comment, "The Ishii Torture movies are still the best-made, rivaled only by certain Kōji Wakamatsu productions (especially Torture Chronicles: 100 Years (1975)), a few from Masaru Konuma (i.e., Wife to be Sacrificed and Flower and Snake (both 1974)) and Go Ijuin's Captured For Sex 2 (1986)."

Ishii worked in several of Toei's popular genres during the 1970s, including a Pinky violent film with Reiko Ike, Female Yakuza Tale: Inquisition and Torture (1973), and one of Sonny Chiba's Street Fighter films in the mid-1970s, The Street Fighter's Last Revenge (Gyakushu! Satsujin Ken). Ishii made two contributions to the biker genre with Detonation! Violent Riders (1975) and Detonation! Violent Games (1976). After 1979 Ishii stopped making theatrical films and worked mainly for television during the 1980s.

Later career
Ishii returned to Toei in 1991 with the V-cinema film The Hit Man: Blood Smells Like Roses. In 1993 he made a film of Yoshiharu Tsuge's manga, Master of the Gensenkan Inn (Gensenkan Shujin), and in 1998 he filmed Tsuge's avant-garde manga, Wind-Up Type (Nejishiki). In 1999 he made Jigoku: Japanese Hell, using the trial of Aum sect leader Shoko Asahara as the main inspiration for the plot. Ishii's last film, The Blind Beast Vs The Dwarf (2001) was another based on the work of Edogawa Rampo.

Largely unknown outside Japan during much of his career, late in life, Ishii's work was discovered and gained admirers in the West. Ishii attended festivals devoted to his films given at the Far East Film Festival in Udine and at the Étrange Festival in France. In his later years, Ishii often spoke of a dream project, a gangster epic with Ken Takakura to be called Once Upon a Time in Japan. Ishii died August 12, 2005 before that project ever became a reality. Directing in a wide range of genres throughout his career, including martial arts, science fiction, horror, erotica, and film noir, Ishii's 83 films are a microcosm of popular cinematic trends in Japan during the second half of the twentieth century.

Filmography

References

Sources
 
 
 
 
 
 
 
 
 
 Tominaga, Shinichi. (2000). "Geishas, Motorcycle Gangs and Supergiants: The World of Teruo Ishii—A spirited discussion between Teruo Ishii and cult director Takao Nakano." (Interview conducted in Tokyo, February 2000) in Asian Cult Cinema, #28, July 2000, p. 48–62.
 
Monell Robert (2017) Bohachi Boshido https://www.tapatalk.com/groups/cinemadrome/viewtopic.php?p=1403#p1403

1924 births
2005 deaths
Deaths from lung cancer in Japan
Japanese film directors
Yakuza film directors
People from Tokyo